UDF 423 is the Hubble Ultra Deep Field (UDF) identifier for a distant spiral galaxy.  With an apparent magnitude of 20, UDF 423 is one of the brightest galaxies in the HUDF and also has one of the largest apparent sizes in the HUDF.

Distance measurements
The "distance" of a far away galaxy depends on how it is measured.  With a redshift of 1, light from this galaxy is estimated to have taken around 7.7 billion years to reach Earth.  However, since this galaxy is receding from Earth, the present comoving distance is estimated to be around 10 billion light-years away.  In context, Hubble is observing this galaxy as it appeared when the Universe was around 5.9 billion years old.

See also
 List of Deep Fields

References

Fornax (constellation)
Spiral galaxies
Hubble Space Telescope
00423